Ann Sybille Rachlin  (born 1933), is an English musician, author of children's books and the founder of 'Fun with Music', a stream of online stories for children with music. She is an authority over Dame Ellen Terry, the Victorian actress, and her daughter Edith Craig.

Life
Rachlin was born in Leeds, England in 1933. Formally known as Ann Lyttleton, Her parents were both born in Leeds. Her father owned a clothing manufacturing business. Her paternal grandmother was born in Wales and her other grandparents came as immigrants from Poland and Lithuania.

Rachlin married Neville Ziff, with whom she had two daughters and one son. They divorced after eleven years. In 1969 she married American conductor and pianist Ezra Rachlin, and they remained married until his death in 1995. Ann's eldest daughter, Jan Ziff died of cancer in Paris in February 2022.

Career
In 1965, Rachlin started to teach classical music to children through her Fun With Music classes. In these classes she related stories over classical tracks. When EMI contracted Rachlin's skills, they launched Ann's Classical Music and Stories series with 10 LPs and almost immediately after another 10 LPs. These were then expanded to include a series of cassette tapes and then CDs. Former students at her classes included Prince William, Prince Harry and amongst others, the children of Dame Judi Dench, Spike Milligan, Peter O'Toole, Barry Humphries and Edward Fox.

In 1976,Rachlin founded the Beethoven Fund for Deaf Children, now incorporated with The Elizabeth Foundation for Deaf Children. She is President of both charities.   She has dedicated her entire life to helping children all over the world.  During the pandemic, realising the problems that lockdown created for families and schools, she made all her recording albums free to children worldwide.  Also during lockdown, she recorded her ten Famous Children books the Royal National Institute for the Blind so that visually-impaired children could be entertained and educated whilst listening.  For blind adults, she recorded The Tin Ring by Holocaust survivor Zdenka Fantlová, also for the RNIB.  She built a tiny studio over her garage as no professional studios could be visited due to Covid restrictions.
In October 2022, she organised and masterminded "Ukraine Reborn - A Concert of Words and Music, performed in Winchelsea's St Thomas' Church, inspiring the cooperation of Raphael Wallfisch (cello) John York (piano) and as narrators, her former pupils, actors Freddie Fox and Emilia Fox who performed, donating their talents.  Ukraine Reborn Concert raised £20,000 for The Saint Nicholas Hospital for Children in Lviv, Ukraine where injured and traumatised children were being treated due to the invasion by Russia 

.
Rachlin's public performances around the world included family "Funtasia" concerts in 1986 with the London Symphony Orchestra, conducted by her husband, Ezra. When Ezra Rachlin died in 1995, Ann Rachlin continued her work with colleague Iain Kerr. In 1996 she was the subject of This Is Your Life when Yehudi Menuhin, Baron Menuhin, Sir Georg Solti and Lord Runcie joined many celebrities, friends and former pupils to pay tribute to her life's work with children and music.

Rachlin is a children's writer whose Famous Children books have been translated into languages including Indonesian, Finnish, Czech and two Chinese versions. She is an authority on the Victorian actress Dame Ellen Terry and her daughter Edith Craig; her collection of Terry memorabilia includes the reminiscences of Edith Craig, now published in Ann Rachlin's book Edy was a Lady..  Her latest book, I am Beethoven's Piano, has been narrated by Freddie Fox and is awaiting a publisher for the paper book editions.

In 1986, Rachlin was appointed Member of the Order of the British Empire by Queen Elizabeth II for her services to music and deaf children. In 2010, Rachlin was awarded a Fellowship at Grey College in the University of Durham. She lives near Winchelsea in East Sussex.

References

External links 
 Fun with Music website
 Personal Website

1933 births
Living people
British music educators
Members of the Order of the British Empire
People from Winchelsea